My Wedding Night (Spanish:Mi noche de bodas) is a 1961 Mexican-Spanish comedy film directed by Tulio Demicheli and starring Concha Velasco, Luis Aguilar and Rafael Alonso.

Cast
 Concha Velasco as Fernanda Jiménez 
 Luis Aguilar as Pedro 
 Rafael Alonso as Cosme Martínez  
 Isabel Garcés as Gabriela  
 María Luisa Merlo as Ivonne  
 Lina Canalejas 
 Gracita Morales as Enriqueta  
 Mari Carmen Prendes as Elena  
 Hugo Pimentel 
 Carlota Bilbao 
 José Orjas as Camarero  
 Manuel de Juan 
 Montserrat Blanch 
 Juan Cortés 
 Agustín González as Alfonso López de Tovar  
 Emilio Rodríguez 
 José Morales 
 A.R. de Quevedo 
 Rafael Corés 
 Antonio Braña 
 Giove Campuzano 
 Carmen Pérez Gallo 
 Tony Leblanc as Juan 
 Goyo Lebrero as Sereno

References

Bibliography
 John King & Nissa Torrents. The Garden of Forking Paths: Argentine Cinema. British Film Institute, 1988.

External links 

1961 films
Mexican comedy films
Spanish comedy films
1961 comedy films
1960s Spanish-language films
Films directed by Tulio Demicheli
1960s Spanish films
1960s Mexican films